Spectacular is the second Korean studio album of South Korean boy band, ZE:A. It was released on July 4, 2012 by Star Empire Entertainment.

Background
Beginning on June 15, 2012 in Busan, ZE:A launched their 'Fighting Project' promotions to promote Spectacular. In these promotions, they held streetcar performances in various cities and met with locals to advertise their second Korean studio album. Concept picture teasers of group members were released on June 22, 2012. Later, the music video teaser for Aftereffect, the title track of Spectacular, was released on June 29, 2012.

ZE:A held a press conference and showcase to preview Spectacular for 1,000 fans. The album's release on July 4, 2012 was preceded by their televised music show promotions, starting with Mnet's M Countdown on July 5, 2012. Due to injuries sustained on an outdoor variety show on May 28, 2012, ZE:A's leader Moon Junyoung was unable to participate in promotions for Spectaculars lead title track, "Aftereffect".

Track listing

See also
ZE:A discography

References

External links
Music Daum Page

ZE:A albums
2012 albums